Barry Ditewig (born 14 October 1977) is a Dutch former professional footballer who played as a goalkeeper.

Club career
Ditewig started his career at SC Heerenveen, and later played two seasons for FC Emmen. After the two seasons in Drenthe and a short spell at amateur club SC Joure, he went to play five successful seasons for BV Veendam where he was the first goalkeeper. However, in 2009, he was told that his contract would not be extended. He chose to play for Team VVCS, a team that tries to earn players without a contract another club. After some good performances, ADO Den Haag, whose had trouble finding keepers, chose to sign Ditewig.

In 2010, Ditewig signed with Achilles '29, an amateur team playing in the Topklasse, the new third division in Dutch football. Ditewig won in his second season this Topklasse and the title of best amateur club of the Netherlands against SV Spakenburg with 3-0 and 0–2.

In 2016, Ditewig moved to MVV Alcides. From the 2018–19 season he played for ONS Sneek. He retired from football in September 2019.

Outside football
Besides football, Ditewig is a sports masseur and studied physical therapy at the Hogeschool Arnhem Nijmegen.

References

External links
 Achilles '29.nl 
 Voetbal International: Barry Ditewig 

1977 births
Living people
People from Veenendaal
Association football goalkeepers
Dutch footballers
VV DOVO players
SC Heerenveen players
FC Emmen players
SC Veendam players
ADO Den Haag players
Achilles '29 players
SV Spakenburg players
Eredivisie players
Eerste Divisie players
Derde Divisie players
ONS Sneek players
Footballers from Utrecht (province)